INN may stand for:

Medicine 

 International nonproprietary name, in pharmaceutics

News 
 Independent News Network
 Independent Network News (disambiguation)
 Institute for Nonprofit News, formerly known as Investigative News Network
 InterNetNews news server
 Israel National News, English name for Israeli media network Arutz Sheva

Other 
 Illegal, Non-reported and Non-regulated Fishing, usually known as IUU (Illegal, unreported and unregulated fishing)
 ImagiNation Network
 The IATA airport code for Innsbruck Kranebitten Airport
 Interfaith Nutrition Network

See also 
 Inn, an establishment for travelers to lodge, eat, and rest
 Inn (disambiguation)